William Wimsatt may refer to:

 William A. Wimsatt (born 1917), professor of Zoology
 William C. Wimsatt (born 1941), philosopher and teacher
 William Kurtz Wimsatt, Jr. (1907-1975), American professor of English
 William Upski Wimsatt (born 1973), graffiti artist, author, and activist